Dawood Ibrahim ( (born 26 December 1955) is an Indian mafia gangster, drug kingpin, and a wanted terrorist from Dongri, Mumbai. He reportedly heads the Indian organised crime syndicate D-Company, which he founded in Mumbai in the 1970s. Ibrahim is wanted on charges including murder, extortion, targeted killing, drug trafficking, and terrorism.

He was designated a global terrorist by India and the United States in 2003, with a reward of US$25 million on his head for his suspected role in the 1993 Bombay bombings. In 2011, he was named number three on "The World's 10 Most Wanted Fugitives" by the U.S. Federal Bureau of Investigation and Forbes. Recently, the Pakistani government listed Dawood and 87 others in its sanction list in order to avoid FATF sanctions.

He has been reported to live in Karachi, Pakistan, though the government of Pakistan denies it. In 2020, the Indian government sold off Dawood's six properties in his ancestral village in Ratnagiri district in coastal Konkan in Maharashtra. The government organized the e-auction of his properties under the Smugglers and Foreign Exchange Manipulators (Forfeiture of Property) Act (SAFEMA), 1976. In November 2017, Dawood's three properties, including the famous Rounaq Afroz Restaurant, also known as Delhi Zaika, were auctioned off by the government.

Early life
Dawood Ibrahim was born on 26 December 1955 to a Konkani Muslim family in Khed in Maharashtra, India. His father, Ibrahim Kaskar, worked as a head constable with the Mumbai Police and his mother, Amina Bi, was a homemaker.
He lived in the Zadgaon area of Dongri and attended Ahmed Sailor High School, from which he dropped out.

Criminal career
Dawood started committing fraud, theft and robbery while still in his teens. Eventually, he joined the gang of local gangster and don Baashu Dada, part of the local organised crime syndicate. In the late 1970s, he later split from the gang, creating his own gang with his elder brother Shabir Ibrahim Kaskar. After Shabir was killed by the rival Pathan gang, he became the sole boss of his gang, known as the D-Company. He was then chiefly involved in gold smuggling, real estate, extortion and drug trafficking. He fled from India to Dubai in 1986 after being wanted by the Mumbai Police for the murder of Samad Khan. In the following years he further expanded his gang with the help of his second-in-command Chhota Rajan, with his gang having over 5000 members and bringing in tens of crores of rupees in revenue annually by the early 1990s.

He was named by the Indian government as one of the masterminds in the 1993 Mumbai Attacks. Following the attacks, he fled Dubai for Karachi, where he is said to live to this day.

The United States Department of the Treasury Office of Foreign Assets Control designated Ibrahim as a terrorist on the Specially Designated Nationals List and the Foreign Narcotics Kingpin Designation Act as part of its international sanctions program, effectively forbidding US financial entities from working with him and seizing assets believed to be under his control. The Department of Treasury keeps a fact sheet on Ibrahim which contains reports of his syndicate having smuggling routes from South Asia, the Middle-East and Africa shared with and used by terrorist organization al-Qaeda. The fact sheet also said that Ibrahim's syndicate is involved in large-scale shipment of narcotics in the United Kingdom and Western Europe. He is also believed to have had contacts with al-Qaeda leader Osama bin-Laden. In the late 1990s, Ibrahim traveled to Afghanistan under the Taliban's protection. The syndicate has consistently aimed to destabilise India through riots, terrorism, civil disobedience and pumping fake Indian currency notes into the country.
India Today reported that Ibrahim provided the logistics for the 2008 Mumbai attacks.

Presently, Ibrahim's criminal activities are terror funding, drug trafficking, gunrunning, extortion and money laundering. He has also heavily invested in real estate in Karachi, Dubai and India. He is believed to control much of the hawala system, which is the very commonly used unofficial system for transferring money and remittances outside the view of official agents. 
He was linked to the financing of increasing attacks in Gujarat by Lashkar-e-Taiba. In 2006, the government of India handed over to Pakistan, a list of 38 most wanted criminals including Ibrahim. His crime syndicate spreads across Asia, Europe and Africa, with over 40% of its earnings coming from India.

1993 Bombay bombings

Dawood is widely believed to have masterminded the March 1993 bombings in Bombay. In 2003, the Indian and United States governments declared Ibrahim a "Global Terrorist." The Indian Deputy Prime Minister Lal Krishna Advani described it as a major development. Ibrahim is currently on India's "Most Wanted List".

In a public discourse in June 2017, Ram Jethmalani confirmed that after the Bombay blasts, Dawood Ibrahim had called him from London, saying that he was prepared to come to India and stand trial, on the condition that he should not be subjected to any third degree treatment from the police. Jethmalani had conveyed this to Sharad Pawar, but the politicians in power did not agree to this proposal. As per Jethmalani, their refusal to allow Dawood's return was due to their fears that he would expose their secrets.

Location
Ibrahim is previously assumed to be living in Pakistan and then in the United Arab Emirates. India says he has shifted to the Pakistan-Afghanistan border. Indian sources add that "Inter-Services Intelligence appeared extremely wary of the new US-Indo cooperation to fight terrorism."
On 5 May 2015 MP Haribhai Chaudhary informed the Lok Sabha (the lower house of India's Parliament) that the whereabouts of Ibrahim were unknown. However, on 11 May, Rajnath Singh, the then Home Minister of India, told the parliament that Ibrahim was in Pakistan and he will bring him back to India.

According to claims of Indian news media Times Now on 22 August 2015, Dawood was in Karachi, Pakistan. According to said media corporation, they had conversation with a woman in Karachi on 22 August 2015. Transcripts of conversations which were published on the news agency's website, in one conversation she said that she is Dawood's wife and "he is sleeping", while in the second conversation she said that there was no one by that name known to her.

According to a dossier prepared by India in August 2015, to be handed over to Pakistan, Ibrahim has nine residences in Pakistan and has three Pakistani passports which he frequently uses to travel.

On 22 August 2020, Pakistan issued two notifications sanctioning key terrorist figures. In it, three addresses of Dawood Ibrahim were listed "White House, Near Saudi Mosque, Clifton" in Karachi, Pakistan; in addition to "House Nu 37 – 30th Street – defence, Housing Authority, Karachi" and "Palatial bungalow in the hilly area of Noorabad in Karachi". Pakistan denied it was admitting he was in Pakistan, stating the notifications only contained what was listed in the list of sanctioned individuals and the entities belonging to the United Nations. He had been designated by the Al-Qaida and Taliban Sanctions Committee with those addresses in 2003.

Search for Dawood Ibrahim 
He was third on Forbes's The World's 10 Most Wanted list from 2010 until it stopped publishing the list in 2011, and is designated a "global terrorist". Many attempts have been made to locate Ibrahim by the Indian intelligence agencies, Research and Analysis Wing and Intelligence Bureau (IB), ever since he went into hiding. His location has been frequently traced to Karachi, Pakistan, a claim which the Pakistani authorities have frequently denied. The claims were further established in August 2015, when a phone call made to his home by an Indian television channel, Times Now, was answered by his wife, who confirmed his presence at their home in Karachi. The Indian intelligence agencies immediately prepared a dossier of Ibrahim which included evidence of his location in Karachi, among other evidence. It was to be presented at the National Security Agency-level talks between the two countries in the same month, which was however, called off due to political reasons.

In an interview with India Today, Chhota Rajan, a former aide of Ibrahim, who he later fell out with in 1992, said that, "He [Ibrahim] does travel out of Pakistan once in a while but Karachi is his base."

Chhota Rajan vs Dawood Ibrahim
Chhota Rajan is believed to have assisted intelligence agencies in getting a low down on the activities of the D-Company and its members by using his intimate knowledge of the criminal  and its operations from his experience. To reinforce his reputation as a patriotic gangster don, Chhota Rajan threatened to brutally murder those accused of engineering the 1993 Bombay bombings. Saleem ‘Kurla’ in April 1998 followed by Mohammad Jindran in June 1998 and Majeed Khan on 1 March 1999 were shot dead.

It is reported that selective police action against the Ibrahim crime syndicate during the Shiv Sena administration and its subsequent decline through encounter killings helped strengthen Chhota Rajan's position in the underworld. This is similar to how Dawood Ibrahim himself had benefitted from the 1980s police campaign against the Pathans. The Shiv Sena laid bare its affection for Chhota Rajan in an editorial in the Saamna newspaper, its mouthpiece, edited by Bal Thackeray. The editorial heaved a sigh of relief, attributing Chhota Rajan's survival to "good fortune" resulting from divine grace. The  Pakistani Inter-Services Intelligence (ISI) was believed to be behind the attempted assassination of Chhota Rajan.

In February 2010, alleged Chhota Rajan associates gunned down Nepali media baron Jamim Shah point blank in broad daylight as he was driving to his residence on a public road. Shah ostensibly had links with Dawood Ibrahim and was the mastermind of a racket producing counterfeit Indian currency within Nepal. His anti-Indian criminal activities had rankled the Indian government for more than a decade and half prior.

Family
In 2006, Ibrahim's daughter, Mahrukh Ibrahim, married Junaid Miandad, the son of Pakistani cricketer Javed Miandad. In 2011, his daughter Mehreen, 24, married Ayub, a Pakistani – American. His son Moin married Saniya, daughter of a London-based businessman on 25 September 2011. Several of his family members, including his brother, Iqbal, live in Mumbai.

In popular culture
Ibrahim and his syndicate D-Company have been linked to the financing of the Bollywood film industry. A number of Bollywood studios and films were financed by D-Company in the 1980s and 1990s. Ibrahim was linked to a number of celebrities during that time, including the beauty pageant contestant Anita Ayub and the Bollywood actress Mandakini. D-Company is also known for extortion and threats targeted towards Bollywood producers and celebrities, and was involved in the murders of Bollywood producers Javed Siddique and Gulshan Kumar.

Vijay Maurya portrayed him in the film Black Friday (2004), directed by Anurag Kashyap.

The 2002 film Company is loosely based on D-Company's activities, and its sequel (prequel to events in the movie), the 2005 film D, as well as Shootout at Lokhandwala (2007), the 2010 film Once Upon a Time in Mumbai and 2013 film D-Day. The 2013 movie Shootout at Wadala is based on the rise of the D-Company. The titular antagonist in the 2016 Indian action-drama film, Dongri Ka Raja, is based on Ibrahim and is portrayed by Gashmeer Mahajani. The film Haseena Parkar (2017) is a biographical crime film based on his sister, Haseena Parkar. The 2018 video game Hitman 2 features a Mumbai crime lord active in the movie industry called "Dawood Rangan" as a target, presumably as a reference to Ibrahim himself.

Dongri to Dubai: Six Decades of the Mumbai Mafia and Byculla to Bangkok are non-fiction books by former Indian investigative journalist Hussain Zaidi. They trace the evolution of the Mumbai mafia. Shootout at Wadala is based on Dongri to Dubai.

See also

 List of fugitives from justice who disappeared
 Organised crime in India
 Tiger Memon
 Yakub Memon
Chhota Shakeel
Chhota Rajan

References

External links
 At Home In Exile
 BBC Profile on Ibrahim
 Mumbai's Mafia War

1955 births
1993 Bombay bombings
Businesspeople from Mumbai
Confidence tricksters
Crime in Maharashtra
Crime in the United Arab Emirates
Criminals from Mumbai
D-Company
Fugitives wanted by India
Fugitives wanted by the United States
Fugitives wanted on counterfeiting charges
Fugitives wanted on organised crime charges
Fugitives wanted on terrorism charges
Indian counterfeiters
Indian drug traffickers
Indian expatriates in Pakistan
Indian expatriates in the United Arab Emirates
Indian crime bosses
Indian money launderers
Indian smugglers
Konkani Muslims
Organised crime in Pakistan
People sanctioned under the Foreign Narcotics Kingpin Designation Act
Specially Designated Nationals and Blocked Persons List
Possibly living people
People designated by the Al-Qaida and Taliban Sanctions Committee
People charged with terrorism
Fugitives wanted on drug trafficking charges
Fugitives wanted on murder charges
People charged with murder